Clarence Benjamin Beville (August 28, 1877 – January 5, 1937) was a pitcher/first baseman in Major League Baseball.

Beville was an original member of the American League Boston Americans club during the  season. He made his debut on May 24, 1901, and played his final game on June 2, 1901.

In two pitching appearances, Beville posted a 0–2 record with one strikeout and a 4.00 ERA in nine innings, including a complete game. As a hitter, he compiled a .286 average (2-for-7) with two doubles, two runs, and one RBI in three games played.

External links

Baseball Library
Retrosheet

Boston Red Sox players
Major League Baseball pitchers
Baseball players from California
1877 births
1937 deaths
Oakland Oaks (baseball) players
Butte Smoke Eaters players
Lowell Tigers players
Haverhill Hustlers players
People from Colusa, California